The Rockhampton Region is a local government area (LGA) in Central Queensland, Australia, located on the Tropic of Capricorn about  north of Brisbane.  Rockhampton is the region's major city; the region also includes the Fitzroy River, Mount Archer National Park and Berserker Range.

History 
Established in 2008, it was preceded by four previous local government areas extending to almost the beginning of local government in Queensland. On 1 January 2014, one of those local government areas, the Shire of Livingstone was restored as an independent council.

Prior to the 2008 amalgamation, the Rockhampton Region existed as four distinct local government areas:

 the City of Rockhampton;
 the Shire of Fitzroy;
 the Shire of Livingstone (now de-amalgamated);
 and the Shire of Mount Morgan.

Rockhampton was proclaimed as Queensland's fourth municipality (after Brisbane, Ipswich and Toowoomba) on 13 December 1860 under the Municipalities Act 1858, a piece of New South Wales legislation inherited by Queensland when it became a separate colony in 1859. It held its first election on 26 February 1861 and its inaugural meeting on 1 March 1861. The municipality had an area of  located on the south bank of the Fitzroy River and had a population of about 600. In 1864, the council was divided into three wards—Fitzroy, Archer and Leichhardt. A proposal to greatly expand its area southwards to include Gracemere and Bouldercombe was rejected in part due to opposition from influential squatters in the area. It achieved a measure of autonomy in 1878 with the enactment of the Local Government Act.

On 11 November 1879, the Gogango Divisional Board was established as one of 74 divisions around Queensland under the Divisional Boards Act 1879. It covered an area of  surrounding the municipality—an area significantly greater than the modern Rockhampton Region covers. A Municipal Borough was proclaimed there on 22 May 1890.

A bridge was built spanning the Fitzroy River in 1882, and a year later in September 1883, the North Rockhampton Borough was proclaimed. North Rockhampton had a somewhat unhappy 36-year existence—its small population and location opposite the stronger and wealthier Rockhampton borough made comparisons inevitable and development of its own identity almost impossible. In 1919, it was described as a "small and straggling hamlet". Nevertheless, it was able to get a loan to construct a Municipal Chambers in 1885, which was completed in December of that year. The town clerk's arrest for embezzlement in 1890 marked the beginning of a period of difficulties characterised by disputes with the surrounding Gogango Divisional Board over road construction, and internal conflict between members of council, in which the Queensland Government was often requested to intervene. It did not have a reliable water supply and at the time of its amalgamation was still trying to raise funds for a dam.

The Fitzroy Division was proclaimed on 6 April 1899 out of the southern part of Gogango. With the passage of the Local Authorities Act 1902, Rockhampton became one of three former municipalities, alongside Brisbane and Townsville, to become a City on 31 March 1903, while North Rockhampton and Mount Morgan became Towns and the divisions of Gogango and Fitzroy became Shires. Gogango was renamed Livingstone on 8 August 1903.

The State Government became concerned in 1918 after both the City of Rockhampton and Town of North Rockhampton councils proposed separate water infrastructure projects. On Saturday 25 January 1919, an amalgamation referendum held in North Rockhampton passed with 884 of the 1,029 votes cast in favour. On 15 March 1919, elections for the new four-ward council with 11 councillors took place, with their first meeting being held five days later. North Rockhampton's chambers, located in Stapleton Park, North Rockhampton, became a Main Roads office for about four decades, and eventually was restored and, since 1985, has been the home of Rockhampton and District Historical Society.

Wards were abolished at some point and were not reintroduced until 1982, when the council was restructured with 10 divisions each electing one councillor, plus a mayor elected by the entire City. On 1 July 1984, the City grew northwards by annexing Parkhurst, where its water treatment facility was being constructed, from the Shire of Livingstone. The council tried on several occasions to expand further into the Livingstone and Fitzroy areas, but a referendum in Fitzroy on 9 February 1991 was opposed by 83% of valid votes cast.

In July 2007, the Local Government Reform Commission released a report making recommendations for statewide reform of local government boundaries, and recommended that the four areas of Rockhampton, Fitzroy, Livingstone and Mount Morgan amalgamate, due to a community of interest centred upon Rockhampton. The very weak sustainability rating given to the Shire of Mount Morgan was of particular concern. On 15 March 2008, the City and Shires formally ceased to exist, and elections were held on the same day to elect councillors and a mayor to the Regional Council.

In 2012, a proposal was made to de-amalgamate the Shire of Livingstone from the Rockhampton Region. On 9 March 2013, the citizens of the former Livingstone shire voted in a referendum to de-amalgamate. The Shire of Livingstone was re-established on 1 January 2014.

Divisions and elections
The Council consists of a Mayor and seven Councillors. The Mayor is elected by the public, and the Councillors are elected from seven single-member divisions using an optional preferential voting system. Elections are held every four years.

Mayors 

 2008–2012: Brad Carter 
 2012–2020: Margaret Strelow 
 2020–2021: Neil Fisher (acting)
 2021–present: Tony Williams

Resignation of Margaret Strelow

Margaret Strelow resigned the Mayoralty on Monday 9 November 2020, following an adverse finding at the Councillor Conduct Tribunal. The misconduct finding related to non-disclosure, or incorrect disclosure, of corporate hospitality received by mining company Adani during a trip to India as part of a delegation of Mayors from Regional Queensland. Strelow publicly stated that she refuted the findings, and that her refusal to agree to having been personally compromised was a matter of personal integrity, but that she had resigned her position in light of the findings.

Following an amendment made to the Local Government Act 2009 (Qld) only a few months prior, Strelow's resignation less than 12 months after being elected meant that the position of Mayor would immediately pass to the runner-up from the Mayoral election of March 2020. The only other candidate in that election had been local environmental activist, Chris "Pineapple" Hooper, who had received less than a third of votes cast in the election. Following uproar over Hooper's "accidental" elevation to the Mayoralty, Local Government Minister Stirling Hinchliffe announced the following day that the Queensland Government would amend the Act to roll back the changes and force a by-election for the role of Mayor as soon as the newly-elected Queensland Parliament had been sworn in.

Following Strelow's resignation as Mayor, it was announced that Deputy Mayor Neil Fisher would fill the role of Acting Mayor until a replacement had been elected. 

On 4 February 2021, Tony Williams was elected as mayor.

Suburbs, towns and localities
The Rockhampton Region includes the following settlements:

Rockhampton area
 Allenstown
 Berserker
 Depot Hill
 Fairy Bower
 Frenchville
 Kawana
 Koongal
 Lakes Creek*
 Limestone Creek
 Mount Archer
 Norman Gardens
 Park Avenue
 Parkhurst
 Port Curtis
 Rockhampton City
 The Common
 The Range
 Wandal
 West Rockhampton

Mount Morgan area
 Mount Morgan
 Baree
 Hamilton Creek
 Horse Creek
 Moongan
 The Mine
 Walterhall

Fitzroy area
 Gracemere
 Alton Downs
 Bajool
 Bouldercombe
 Bushley
 Dalma
 Garnant
 Glenroy
 Gogango
 Kabra
 Kalapa
 Marmor
 Midgee
 Morinish
 Morinish South
 Nine Mile
 Pink Lily
 Port Alma
 Ridgelands
 Stanwell
 Westwood
 Wycarbah

* - shared with the Shire of Livingstone

Population
The populations given relate to the component entities prior to 2008. The census in 2011 was the first for the new Region.

Council facilities 

The council owns six business units which are city-owned enterprises managed on commercial lines:

 Rockhampton International Airport
Fitzroy River Water
Rockhampton Showgrounds
Gracemere Saleyards
Pilbeam Theatre
Rockhampton Regional Art Gallery
Rockhampton Regional Council operates a headquarters public library at 230 Bolsover Street, Rockhampton ("Southside"). Branch libraries are located in Berserker ("Rockhampton North"), Gracemere, Mount Morgan and West Rockhampton ("Anytime" at Rockhampton Airport).

References

 
Local government areas of Queensland
2008 establishments in Australia